Maitland is a city in the Lower Hunter Valley of New South Wales, Australia and the seat of Maitland City Council, situated on the Hunter River approximately  by road north of Sydney and  north-west of Newcastle.

The city centre is located on the right bank of the Hunter River, protected from moderate potential flooding by a levee.

Surrounding areas include the cities of Cessnock and Singleton local government areas.

History
The Wonnarua People were the first known people of this land. They called the area where Maitland is now situated, by the name Bo-un after a species of bird.

From around 1816, cedar logging parties from the convict settlement of Newcastle were the first Europeans to stay on the site. Governor Lachlan Macquarie visited the area in 1818, naming it Wallis Plains after Captain James Wallis who was commandant of the Newcastle penal colony at the time. In 1819, convict farmers were allowed to select land at Wallis Plains, the most notable of which was Molly Morgan. By 1821 the first British government buildings, consisting of a cottage and barracks, were constructed, and in 1823 James Mudie financed the construction of a wharf. Two years later William Powditch opened the first general store at Wallis Plains.

In 1829, assistant surveyor George Boyle White, officially laid out a township on the site of Wallis Plains. The village was called Maitland possibly in honour of Frederick Lewis Maitland. Due to population growth, Maitland was partitioned in 1835 into West Maitland (which was the original Wallis Plains settlement) and East Maitland. The nearby town of Morpeth developed at the same time from the Green Hills land grant given to Lieutenant Edward Charles Close, a Peninsular War veteran. Morpeth served as the head of navigation for larger ships (later, steamships), and goods were transhipped upriver to West Maitland on barges and smaller vessels.

West Maitland was therefore the point at which goods were unloaded for, and distributed to, the prosperous riverland of the Hunter Valley. Accordingly, there were large warehouses (some of which still exist) built, which faced onto the main High Street and backed onto the Hunter River. The arrival of the railway from Newcastle in the 1850s, coupled with the increasing silting of the river and larger ships spelt the end of the traditional river traffic.

The municipalities of West and East Maitland were merged in 1944 and the name of West Maitland was officially reverted to Maitland in 1949, from which the present city is now known. The city's boundaries have been increased by incorporating parts of other local government areas since then (most notably Kearsley Shire which from 1946 to 1949 was the only local government area in Australia's history to have a Communist majority of councillors).

The first electricity connected in the area was to Maitland Town Hall in 1922, to the Hall's front light.

Belmore Bridge

The first bridge to link West Maitland with what is now the suburb of Lorn was opened in 1869 and named in honour of the then Governor of New South Wales, the 4th Earl of Belmore. Although the bridge proved vital to the city's development, the floods of 1893, 1913 and 1930 began to heighten the need for a new bridge that could withstand periodic flooding. A second Belmore Bridge, designed to withstand the impact of debris during floods, was built adjacent to the 1869 bridge in 1964. The new bridge, which redirected traffic away from St Andrews Street to a new intersection at the Maitland Court House, is one of the city's three main river crossings.

Floods

Maitland's proximity to the Hunter River has resulted in a succession of floods since European settlement. Of these 13, all have had a direct effect on the city of Maitland.

Between 1830 and 1834 Maitland experienced five floods. The 1834 flood water reached the same height. In the winter of 1857 the Hunter River rose again to record heights, reaching . Flooding continued for the next 30 years with the floods of the 1890s being the most disastrous. Much of the riverbank collapsed and many people were left without homes or personal possessions.

However, the 1940s and 1950s saw an increase in rainfall and the river rose again and again. In February 1955, Maitland and the Hunter Valley experienced its most severe flood in recorded history. The 1955 Hunter Valley floods, also commonly known as "The Maitland Flood", was the first Australian natural disaster to be broadcast by the media on an international scale. This flood is considered to be one of Australia's worst floods. The waters reached  and caused catastrophic damage. Seven thousand buildings and homes were damaged and the flood claimed the lives of 14 people.

In early June 2007 an intense low pressure system which caused devastating storms to hit the city of Newcastle and the Central Coast also caused major flooding throughout the lower Hunter Region including the Maitland area. Other areas did not escape with waters inundating homes in Branxton, Louth Park and Raymond Terrace. The flood has been compared to the devastating 1955 Hunter Valley floods.

From 20 to 22 April 2015, heavy rainfall in the Hunter, Central Coast and Sydney regions of New South Wales resulted in flash flooding and extended power outages to over 200,000 homes. Maitland was badly affected and the flood gates at Maitland railway station were reinforced with sandbags to prevent flooding in central Maitland. Four people died as a result of the storms and a further four died in traffic related incidents.

Jewish community 

The Maitland Jewish Cemetery in Louth Park, one of only two provincial Jewish cemeteries in New South Wales, is testament to the Jewish community that was active in Maitland up until the 1930s. Between about 1846 and 1934, 53 Jewish people were buried in the low-lying cemetery. Burials ceased after this time due to dissipation of the community and the cemetery reaching capacity. One exception was Lea Abadee in 2010. The former Maitland Synagogue, located on Church Street, was the place of worship for about 70 families between 1879 and 1898.

Hospital 
The Immigrants Home was founded by Caroline Chisholm in East Maitland and was the first public building that was used to treat the sick. The site eventually became known as Maitland Benevolent Asylum.  In 1835, when the population hit 1900, residents started to petition for a new hospital. In 1843 a meeting was called to discuss applying to Benevolent Asylum in Sydney. A committee was formed and succeeded in obtaining a grant of £1000 for a new hospital on 5 December 1844.  In April 1845 Sir George Gipps approved a grant of a site at Campbell's Hill, West Maitland opposite Boyne's Inn. The foundation stone was laid by Edward Denny Day on 26 January 1846. In April 1846 the foundation stone was removed and was never recovered. In September 1847 the Building Committee announced that plans for the building of the new hospital would be accepted. The cost of the building was not to exceed £2000 and fifteen guineas would be awarded to the party furnishing the approved plan. By May 1848 the Maitland Mercury was reporting that the walls of the new hospital were visible from the town. Opened in 1850 its first years saw 231 patients and 26 deaths. Between 1903 and 1905 saw the competition of the Ward Block 1 at the southern end of the hospital. With the growth of population in the district, it was found that the accommodation was inadequate and a new building was erected and opened in 1905. In 1916 a blood bank and isolation cottage were completed. In 1926 the hospital became a training school for nurses. New nurses' quarters which occupied the site of the old Royal Oak Hotel was built during the twelve months from October 1927 to October 1928. In the 1930s Ward Block 3 was built and extensions were completed to the nurses home in 1932 and 1937.

The Addison Building (Ward Block 2) was progressively built and opened between 1942 and 1947. In 1960 new Nurses homes was built. In 1973 a new pathology building was opened. From 1975 to 1979 a new boilerhouse and workshops were built and the kitchen, cafeteria and storage areas were refurbished.

The hospital was funded through subscribers, collection boxes, donations and state revenue for fines. In 1847 Governor Sir Charles Fitzroy visited to the hospital to hand over a £10.

The Maitland Hospital was listed as a public hospital under the Second Schedule of the Public Hospitals Act, 1898 (Act No.16, 1898). Maitland Hospital was registered as a training hospital under the Nurses Registration Act, 1924 (Act No.37, 1924).  From 1 November 1929 'The Maitland Hospital' was a hospital incorporated under Part IV of the Public Hospitals Act 1929 (Act No.8, 1929). Under this Act The Maitland Hospital was to be governed by a board of directors which could make by-laws and its subscribers were a body corporate which could be sue and be sued in its corporate name. ·The Area Health Services Act 1986 (Act No.50, 1986), which commenced on1 July 1986, effectively abolished the boards of directors and replaced them with area health boards this made the hospital a part of the Lower Hunter Area Health Service. From 1 August 1988 following the amalgamation of area health services the Maitland Hospital became part of the Hunter Area Health Service. Following amendments to the Health Services Act 1997 the Maitland Hospital became part of the Hunter and New England Area Health Service from 1 January 2005.

Heritage listings 

Maitland has a number of heritage-listed sites, including:
 Church Street: Brough House
 47 Church Street: Maitland Synagogue
 66 Church Street: St Mary's the Virgin Anglican Church
 71 Church Street: Grossmann House
 12–14 Free Church Street: Presbyterian High School
 High Street: Maitland Court House
 High Street: Maitland Town Hall
 381 High Street: Maitland Post Office
 473 High Street: Barden and Ribee Saddlery
 516 High Street: Department of Mineral Resources Historic Photographs Collection
 Main Northern railway: Maitland railway station
 34 Regent Street: Cintra House
 5 Victoria Street: Maitland Lodge of Unity Masonic Hall and Lodge

Population
 Aboriginal and Torres Strait Islander people made up 5.4% of the population.
 86.5% of people were born in Australia. The next most common countries of birth were England 1.8%, New Zealand 1.0%, India 0.5%, Philippines 0.5% and South Africa 0.4%.
 90.9% of people spoke only English at home. Other languages spoken at home included Mandarin 0.4%, Cantonese 0.2%, Tagalog 0.2%, Afrikaans 0.2% and Malayalam 0.2%.
 The most common responses for religion were Catholic 26.2%, Anglican 24.3% and No Religion 24.2%.

Crime
Maitland has an assault rate of 1,110.4 per 100,000 population, which is significantly higher than the NSW state average of 823.4 per 100,000 population.

Climate
Maitland experiences a humid subtropical climate (Köppen: Cfa, Trewartha: Cfal); with hot summers and mild winters; and with moderate precipitation year round. The highest temperature recorded at Maitland was 44.5 °C (112.1 °F) on the 18th of January 2013 and 21st of February 2004; the lowest recorded was −4.5 °C (23.9 °F) on 24th of August 2003. The average annual rainfall is 837.5 millimetres (32.97 in). On average, it has 90.3 clear days annually.

Economy

Retail 
Maitland has many shopping precincts including Stockland Green Hills (East Maitland), Centro Maitland Hunter Mall, High Street Mall (City Centre), Rutherford, Melbourne Street (East Maitland) and Lawes Street (East Maitland). Morpeth, a suburb of Maitland, is also popular for its fashion boutiques, cafes and speciality shops.

Transport

Rail

Maitland railway station lies on the Hunter line and is the branch point for the Main North Line and the North Coast Line.
Other railway stations in Maitland include:
 East Maitland
 High Street
 Metford
 Mindaribba
 Telarah
 Victoria Street
 Thornton

A passenger tram system ran from East Maitland to West Maitland between 1909 and 1926 after which it was replaced by buses which continue to service the route today.

Air

Maitland Airport is a general aviation airfield located beside the New England Highway at Rutherford. Construction was started in 1948 by the now-defunct Maitland Aero Club. In 1957, operation of the airfield transferred to the Royal Newcastle Aero Club (RNAC) which moved from Broadmeadow Aerodrome, its original base of operations, in 1963. The closest commercial airport is Newcastle Airport which is at Williamtown.

Media
Maitland is serviced by a number of regional newspapers, radio stations and television stations.

Print

The Maitland Mercury and The Newcastle Herald are the foremost newspapers in the city. The Mercury, established in 1843, operates out of offices on High Street and is Australia's oldest regional newspaper. The Lower Hunter Star is an adjunct to the Mercury and is published every Thursday. With a circulation of almost 20,000, The Lower Hunter Star is delivered to most residents within the City of Maitland.

Radio
Radio stations include:

AM stations
 2HD (commercial)
 1233 ABC Newcastle (ABC Local Radio)
 2HRN (off band commercial)
 Sky Sports Radio (as part of statewide network)

FM stations
 Triple M Newcastle (commercial)
 hit106.9 Newcastle (commercial)
 New FM (commercial)
 2NUR (community)
 2CHR (Central Hunter Radio) 96.5 FM – (community)
 Rhema FM Newcastle (Christian)
 Triple J  (Australian Broadcasting Corporation)

Government broadcasters
 Australian Broadcasting Corporation
 1233 ABC Newcastle
 ABC Radio National
 ABC News Radio
 Triple J (youth station)
 ABC Classic FM (classical music)
 SBS Radio (foreign language service)

Television
Maitland is part of the Newcastle-Hunter Region television market, which is served by 5 television networks, three commercial and two national services. These networks are listed as follows:

 Nine Network, 9Gem (digital only) and 9Go!  (digital only), 9Life : (Nine Network O&O station, incumbent station, (NBN TV) established 1962).
 10 Northern NSW, 10 Bold (digital only) and 10 Peach (digital only) : (Network Ten affiliate, (formerly known as Southern Cross Ten, TEN Northern N.S.W.,NRTV and WIN Television) was established as a result of aggregation on 31 December 1991).
 Prime7 (formerly known as Prime Television), 7Two (digital only) and 7mate (digital only), 7flix: (Seven Network  / Prime affiliate was established as a result of aggregation on 31 December 1991).
 ABC Television including ABC1, ABC Comedy/ABC 4 Kids/ABC Arts (digital only), ABC ME (digital only) and ABC News 24. The ABC TV service was established in the 1960s.
 SBS Television including SBS ONE and SBS Two (digital only). SBS Television is Australian government operated. This service was introduced in the 1980s.

NBN produces an evening news bulletin combining local, state, national and international news screening nightly at 6.00PM on Channel 9, while Prime7 and WIN Television produce short local updates to fulfil local content quotas.
Subscription television service Foxtel is also available via satellite.

Theatre
The famous Scottish entertainer Sir Harry Lauder performed to a packed audience in Maitland Town Hall on Saturday 15 August 1925.

Culture

Art 
Maitland Regional Art Gallery, or MRAG, opened at its current site in November 2003. In 2008, the gallery closed for redevelopment and was reopened on the 15 August 2009 by the artist Margaret Olley.

Library 
Maitland and the surrounding area is serviced by the Maitland City Library and branches.

Annual events
 Hunter Valley Steamfest is an annual festival celebrating the history of steam power and industry in the Maitland area. It was established in 1986 in response to the closure of the last coal operated steam hauled freight service on the South Maitland Railway network in 1983.
 Bitter & Twisted Beer Festival is an annual international boutique beer festival held at the historic Maitland Gaol in East Maitland.
 ChapelJazz (formerly Morpeth Jazz Festival) is an annual music festival held at the popular historic riverside port of Morpeth. It is a celebration of music, wine and food.
 Groovin' the Moo is an annual music festival held at the Maitland Showground since 2006.
 Maitland Show is an annual agricultural show held at the Maitland Showground.

Education

Maitland has many educational facilities ranging from primary and high schools to short course vocational training operations. The Hunter Institute of TAFE has a campus in Maitland, as does the privately owned Hunter Valley Training Company that is Australia's largest group trainer. These facilities provide excellent training in all fields, especially building and construction, engineering, mining, tourism and business administration.

Maitland has twenty primary schools and seven high schools. Local high schools include:
 St Joseph's College, Lochinvar (formerly All Saints College, St Joesph's Campus)
 All Saints College, St Mary's Campus
 All Saints College, St Peter's Campus
 Hunter Valley Grammar School
 Maitland Christian School
 Maitland Grossmann High School (formerly Maitland Girls' High School)
 Maitland High School (formerly Maitland Boys' High School)
 Rutherford Technology High School
 Francis Greenway High School

There are also numerous pre-school and day care facilities.

Sport and recreation

Maitland has a strong sporting community with a range of sporting competitions and clubs based in the city.  This includes, but is not limited to, the following:

 Maitland FC - Association football club that competes in the National Premier Leagues Northern NSW competition.
 Maitland Pickers - Rugby league club that competes in the Newcastle Rugby League competition.
 Maitland Blacks - Rugby union club that competes in the Newcastle and Hunter Rugby Union competition.
 Maitland Saints - Australian rules football club that competes in the AFL Hunter Central Coast competition.
 Maitland Off-road Radio Car Club, racing at Harold Gregson Reserve.

Maitland is generally accepted to be the birthplace of Motorcycle speedway when New Zealand born promoter Johnny S. Hoskins organised a series of motorcycle races at the West Maitland Showground on Saturday, 15 December 1923.

Notable people 
 William Arnott (1827–1901)  biscuit manufacturer
 John Bell (1940–) actor
 David Berthold theatre director
 Greg Bird (1984–) professional rugby league player
 Alexander Brown (1851–1926) merchant and politician
 George Lyndon Carpenter (1872–1948) Salvation Army general
 Caroline Chisholm (1808–1877) philanthropist, sheltered homeless immigrants in a cottage at Maitland
 Percy Brereton Colquhoun (1866–1936) sportsman, lawyer and politician
 Abbie Cornish (1982–) actress
 Michael Cox (born 1956), cricketer, born in Newcastle, raised in Maitland
 Ruth Cracknell (1925–2002) actress
 Les Darcy (1895–1917) boxer and folk hero
 Edward Davis (1816–1841) "Teddy the Jewboy", Australian convict turned bushranger
 Edward Denny Day (1801–1876), police magistrate
 Justin Dooley (1970–) rugby league player
 Luke Dorn (1982–) professional rugby league player
 Joseph Wilfrid Dwyer (1869–1939) Roman Catholic Bishop of Wagga Wagga
 Nick Enright (1950–2003) playwright
 H. V. Evatt (1894–1965) former leader of the Australian Labor Party, Third President of the United Nations General Assembly, Justice of the High Court of Australia, Chief Justice of the Supreme Court of New South Wales
 Clive Evatt (1900–1984) Australian politician, barrister and raconteur
 Allen Fairhall (1909–2006) politician and Member of the Parliament of Australia for the Division of Paterson
 Brett Finch (1981–) rugby league player and sportscaster 
 Robert Finch (1956–) rugby league player
 Michael Scott Fletcher (1868–1947) Methodist minister, foundation master of Wesley College, University of Sydney
 Allan Grice (1942–) Motor racing driver, two-time winner of the Bathurst 1000
 Ben Hall (1837–1865) bushranger
 Isaac Heeney (1996-) AFL player
 Harry Holgate (1933–1997) politician, 36th Premier of Tasmania
 Matt Jobson (1980–) rugby league player
 Ellis Lawrie (1907–1978) politician
 Frank Liddell (1862–1939) politician
 Edmund Lonsdale (1843–1913) politician
 Charles Macartney (1886–1958) cricketer
 Jack Marx (1965–) journalist and author
 Charles Stuart Mein (1841–1890) barrister, politician and judge
 Jim Morgan (1943–2005) rugby league player
 George Moore (1820–1916), cricketer, born in England, but lived most of his live in Maitland
 Milton Morris (1924–2019) NSW state politician known for his role in the Supercar scare of 1972
 Mollie McNutt (1885 -1919) poet
 Sir Arthur William Morrow (1903–1977) physician
 Nell (1975–) artist
 Ziggy Niszczot (1955–) rugby league player
 Walter O'Hearn (1890–1950) politician
 Margaret Olley (1923–2011) painter
 Noel Pidding (1927–2013) rugby league player

 Baker Russell (1837–1911) Australian-born British Army officer
 Henry Chamberlain Russell (1836–1907) astronomer and meteorologist
 David Trewhella (1962–) rugby league player
 William Samuel Viner (1881–1933) Australian chess master
 Walter Lawry Waterhouse (1887–1969) agricultural scientist
 Alasdair Webster (1934–) politician
 Mary Dunstan Wilson (1870–1959) Sister of Charity, educator
 Caitlin Wood (1997–) racing driver
 Leonora Wray (1886–1979) golfer
 Peter Wynn (1957–) rugby league player
 Hudson Young (1998–) rugby league player

See also

 Maitland, South Australia
 South Maitland coalfields

References

External links

 Maitland City Council
Maitland City Library
 Hunter Region
 History of the Maitland Mercury – State Library of NSW
 

 
Hunter River (New South Wales)